Love is a Broadway Hit is a Chinese romantic comedy film written and directed by Peter Lee.

Plot 
A new musical and dance show named Mulan is going to release on Broadway. A rivalry soon forms for the leading role between a newly graduate actress Qi Bai (played by Wang Likun), and a youthful actor Weidong Song (played by Godfrey Gao). The two first meet in a restaurant as part-time co-workers and then both realize they become competitors on stage. Qi believes that Mulan was a heroine so she has more possibility than Weidong to get the role. Yet the director decides both of them have equal chances. From rehearsal stage to part-time workplace, Qi and Weidong compete everywhere. As time goes by, their competition becomes intense yet love is quietly sprouting.

Cast 
 Godfrey Gao as Song Wei Dong
 Wang Likun as Bai Qi 
 Kenan Heppe as Josh
 Wang Chuanjun as Tony
 Li Yuan (李媛), as Fang 
 Naren Weiss as Pi
 Denis Ooi as Prince Claude
Lauren Downie as Jamie
 Mark Andrew Garner as Mark (Broadway Dancer)

Production
Casting for the film took place in late 2016. Production took place in New York City.

References

External links

2017 films
Chinese romantic comedy films
Chinese musical comedy films
Films shot in New York City
2017 romantic comedy films
2010s musical comedy films
2010s romantic musical films